Jaelon Acklin (born August 10, 1995) is an American professional Canadian football wide receiver for the Ottawa Redblacks of the Canadian Football League (CFL). He played college football at Western Illinois. Acklin has also been a member of the Baltimore Ravens and Hamilton Tiger-Cats.

College career
Acklin played college football for Western Illinois.

Statistics

Professional career

Baltimore Ravens
Acklin was signed by the Baltimore Ravens as an undrafted free agent and participated in their 2018 training camp; however, after a hip injury near the end of camp, Acklin was released by the Ravens.

Hamilton Tiger-Cats
On March 20, 2019, Acklin signed with the Hamilton Tiger-Cats. He participated in both of the Ticats' preseason games, recording 10 receptions for 85 yards. Following preseason and training camp, Acklin began the 2019 season on the team's practice roster. Following an injury to Luke Tasker, Acklin was made a starting wide receiver and played in his first professional game on June 22, 2019 against the Toronto Argonauts where he had five catches for 59 yards. He scored his first CFL touchdown on July 4, 2019 against the Montreal Alouettes. Acklin was voted the team nominee for the Most Outstanding Rookie award for the East Division champion Tiger-Cats. Acklin re-signed with the Tiger-Cats on January 2, 2021. He became a free agent upon the expiry of his contract on February 8, 2022.

Ottawa Redblacks
On February 9, 2022, it was announced that Acklin had signed with the Ottawa Redblacks. Acklin enjoyed a breakout season in 2022 with the Redblacks, despite inconsistent quarterback play he posted career highs in receptions, targets and yards. Acklin missed a few games at the end of the season after suffering head and shoulder injuries after an illegal hit from Montreal Alouettes’ linebacker Micah Awe. Following the season Acklin had a workout with the Denver Broncos of the National Football League (NFL).

Professional statistics

References

External links
Ottawa Redblacks bio

1995 births
Living people
Sportspeople from Springfield, Missouri
Players of American football from Missouri
Canadian football wide receivers
Western Illinois Leathernecks football players
Hamilton Tiger-Cats players
American football wide receivers
Ottawa Redblacks players